John Avery (c. 1738–1808) was one of the main organ builders in England during the late 18th and early 19th centuries.

Life
Avery was mainly based in London. He had a reputation as a colourful character, occasionally falling foul of the law, being declared bankrupt in 1775 and again in 1801, and having a reputation as a 'shocking drunken character'. Despite this he was responsible for some important organs, including those in King's College, Cambridge and Winchester Cathedral.

He appeared at the Old Bailey as a witness in two trials in 1797:
on 12 July 1797 in the trial of Henry Gray, who was accused of stealing a handkerchief from Avery's pocket.
on 20 September 1797 in the trial of Joseph Robson, who was accused of stealing Avery's tools.

One of his apprentices, Alexander Buckingham, went on to work with Thomas Elliot before becoming an independent organ builder.

He died in Giltspur Street Compter.

Organs
Little work by Avery survives, but there is an organ at Ponsonby Baptist Church, New Zealand, and one in the Finchcocks collection at Goudhurst, Kent.

New organs built by Avery include:
Ditton Parish Church, Kent 1774
St Stephen's Church, Coleman Street, London 1775
St Michael's Mount, Cornwall 1786 (originally constructed for John Lemon, MP for Truro)
Sevenoaks Parish Church 1788
Quebec Chapel, Westminster 1788
Coggeshall Parish Church, Essex 1790
All Saints Church, Kingston upon Thames 1793
Croydon Parish Church 1794
Lambeth Asylum 1797
Stroud Parish Church 1798
Winchester Cathedral 1799
Christ Church, Bath 1800
King's College, Cambridge 1803
St Margaret's Church, Westminster 1804
Carlisle Cathedral 1806

References

British pipe organ builders
Organ builders of the United Kingdom
Manufacturing industries in London
Year of birth uncertain
1750s births
1807 deaths